Amherst Shore is a small community in the Canadian province of Nova Scotia, located  in Cumberland County.

References
Amherst Shore on Destination Nova Scotia

Communities in Cumberland County, Nova Scotia